Pope Stephen VI (died August 897) was the bishop of Rome and ruler of the Papal States from 22 May 896 to his death. He is best known for instigating the Cadaver Synod, which ultimately led to his downfall and death.

Family and career
Stephen was born in Rome. His father was a priest named John. Stephen was made bishop of Anagni by Pope Formosus, possibly against his will.

Pontificate
The circumstances of his election as pope are unclear, but he was sponsored by one of the powerful Roman families, the dukes of Spoleto, that contested the papacy at the time.

Stephen is chiefly remembered in connection with his conduct towards the remains of Pope Formosus. The rotting corpse of Formosus was exhumed and put on trial, before an unwilling synod of the Roman clergy, in the so-called Cadaver Synod in January 897. Pressure from the Spoleto contingent and Stephen's fury with Formosus probably precipitated this extraordinary event. With the corpse propped up on a throne, a deacon was appointed to answer for the deceased pontiff. During the trial, Formosus's corpse was condemned for performing the functions of a bishop when he had been deposed and for accepting the papacy while he was the bishop of Porto, among other revived charges that had been levelled against him in the strife during the pontificate of John VIII. The corpse was found guilty, stripped of its sacred vestments, deprived of three fingers of its right hand (the blessing fingers), clad in the garb of a layman, and quickly buried; it was then re-exhumed and thrown in the Tiber. All ordinations performed by Formosus were annulled.

The trial excited a tumult. Though the instigators of the deed may actually have been Formosus' Spoletan enemies, notably Guy IV of Spoleto, who had recovered their authority in Rome at the beginning of 897 by renouncing their broader claims in central Italy, the scandal ended in Stephen's imprisonment and his death by  strangulation that summer.

See also

List of popes who died violently

References

Sources

Jégou, Laurent (2015). "Compétition autour d'un cadavre. Le procès du Pape Formose et ses enjeux (896-904)."  Revue Historique vol. 317, no. 3 (675), 2015, pp. 499–523. Accessed 11 April 2020.
Leyser, Conrad (2010). "Episcopal Office in the Italy of Liudprand of Cremona, C.890-c.970." The English Historical Review 125, no. 515 (2010), pp. 795–817, at pp. 800–802; 811–813. Accessed 11 April 2020. 

Di Vito Loré, Marina C. Sarramia (2019). "Stefano VI, papa." Dizionario Biografico degli Italiani  Volume 94 (Treccani: 2019).

Popes
Italian popes
Bishops of Anagni
Year of birth missing
897 deaths
9th-century archbishops
9th-century popes
Deaths by strangulation
Heads of government who were later imprisoned
Burials at St. Peter's Basilica